USS Macdonough may refer to the following ships of the United States Navy:

, was an early destroyer, launched in 1900 and served until 1919
, was a Clemson-class destroyer, launched in 1920 and served until 1930
, was a Farragut-class destroyer, launched in 1934 and served through World War II until 1945
, was a Farragut-class guided missile frigate (destroyer leader), launched in 1959 and served until 1992

See also
 a Liberty ship

United States Navy ship names